The Abhidharma  Śāstra is an ancient Buddhist text. It is thought to have been authored around 150 CE. It is an encyclopedic work on Abhidharma, scholastic Buddhist philosophy. Its composition led to the founding of a new school of thought, called Vaibhāṣika ('those [upholders] of the Vibhāṣa'), which was very influential in the history of Buddhist thought and practice.

The  Compendia

 is a Sanskrit term meaning 'compendium', 'treatise' or simply 'explanation', derived from the prefix vi + the verbal root √bhāṣ, 'speak' or 'explain'. Evidence strongly indicates that there were originally many different  texts, mainly commenting on the Jñānaprasthāna, but also commenting on other Abhidharma texts too. The relationship between all these texts is very complex, as there is mutual influence, and the texts underwent some development from initial inception to completion.

The tradition of the Mahāvibhāṣa states that it was taught by the Buddha himself, but differs as to the circumstances.  It was later Kātyayanīputra who was responsible for the compilation thereof.  The Mahā-prajñā-pāramitopadeśa (which actually refers to the Aṣṭaskandha) states that 100 years after the Buddha's demise, there arose doctrinal disputes among the great masters, giving rise to distinctly named schools.

Xuanzang maintained that it was written some three centuries after the Buddha, which would be c. 150 BCE.

, by Katyāyāniputra

Its compilation, however, is attributed to a certain Katyāyāniputra. This date and authorship is based on the Chinese translation, also of Xuanzang, and also other historical considerations. It appears in the Taisho in its own volume, due to its huge size: T27, No. 1545, 阿毘達磨大毘婆沙論, 五百大阿羅漢等造, 三藏法師玄奘奉　詔譯, in a massive 200 fasc. which is larger than the previous Abhidharma texts combined, and a third of the total Abhidharma literature. The  is an older translation, translated by Buddhavarman and Daotai: T28, No. 1546, 阿毘達磨毘婆沙論, 迦旃延子造, 五百羅漢釋, 北涼天竺沙門浮陀跋摩共道泰等譯.

Contents

As such an immense text, it contains a huge array of material.

With regards the former two, their 'unorthodox' and 'incorrect' doctrines are taken to task from the perspective of the Buddhist Sarvāstivāda.  With regards the latter, several views are often expressed as more detailed descriptions of Sarvāstivāda doctrines.  These are often open ended, with no particular explanation favored over another, though sometimes a particular explanation is extolled as being particularly clear and in harmony with the teachings.

Due to both of the above reasons, the  literature is particularly useful in not only understanding this school, but in also getting a good perspective on the general state of the Buddha Dharma, and other non-Buddhist religions at the time.

Sarvāstivāda of Kāśmīra

Some scholars feel that some of the  texts that are now lost, possibly represented a similar authoritative text as held by the Gandhāra Sarvāstivāda, or other centers of orthodoxy. It was due to the predominance of this text and its teachings at the time, that Vasubandhu engaged in the study thereof, as a compendium that encompassed all the essential teachings.

Mahāyāna history

The Mahāvibhāṣā contains a great deal of doctrinal material with a strong affinity to Mahāyāna doctrines. According to Karl Potter, the information in the Mahāvibhāṣā concerning the Mahāyāna is of considerable importance. The text is known to employ the outlook of Buddhist practice as consisting of the Three Vehicles:

 Śrāvakayāna
 Pratyekabuddhayāna
 Bodhisattvayāna

It also describes accommodations reached between the Hīnayāna and Mahāyāna traditions, as well as the means by which Mahāyāna doctrines would become accepted. The Mahāvibhāṣā defines the Mahāyāna teachings, which are described as Vaipulya (Ch. 方廣), a commonly used synonym for the Mahāyāna teachings:.

According to a number of scholars, Mahāyāna Buddhism flourished during the time of the Kuṣāṇa Empire, and this is illustrated in the form of Mahāyāna influence on the Mahāvibhāṣā. The Mañjuśrīmūlakalpa also records that Kaniṣka presided over the establishment of Prajñāpāramitā doctrines in the northwest of India. According to Paul Williams, the similarly massive Mahāprajñāpāramitāupadeśa also has a clear association with the Vaibhāṣika Sarvāstivādins.

References to Bodhisattvayāna and the practice of the Six Pāramitās are commonly found in Sarvāstivāda works. The Sarvāstivādins did not hold that it was impossible, or even impractical to strive to become a fully enlightened buddha (Skt. ), and therefore they admitted the path of a bodhisattva as a valid one.

References

Early Buddhist texts
Buddhism in China
Sarvāstivāda
Abhidharma
2nd-century Buddhism